Frank Maichle (April 20, 1896 – August 10, 1983) was an American wrestler. He competed in the Greco-Roman light heavyweight event at the 1920 Summer Olympics.

References

External links
 

1896 births
1983 deaths
Olympic wrestlers of the United States
Wrestlers at the 1920 Summer Olympics
American male sport wrestlers
People from Cohocton, New York
Sportspeople from New York (state)
People from Kenilworth, Illinois